Suhayl Saadi (born 1961, Beverley, Yorkshire) is a physician, author and dramatist based in Glasgow, Scotland. His varied literary output includes novels, short stories, anthologies of fiction, song lyrics, plays for stage and radio theatre, and wisdom pieces for The Dawn Patrol, the Sarah Kennedy show on BBC Radio 2.

Works

Saadi's 2004 novel, Psychoraag, which won a PEN Oakland/Josephine Miles Literary Award, was also shortlisted for the James Tait Black Memorial Prize and nominated for both the International Dublin Literary Award and the National Literary Award (the Patras Bokhari Prize) in Pakistan.

The Scottish Book Trust designated Psychoraag one of the 100 Best Scottish Books of all time. The French translation was released in November 2007 by the Paris-based publisher Éditions Métailié.

Suhayl Saadi has written about subjects as diverse as psychedelic music, Sufism, the British pantomime, the future of creativity, and the relationship of literature to global politics, for many periodicals, including The Independent, The Times, The Herald, The Sunday Herald, The Scotsman, and Spike Magazine, and for the British Council. His short story collection, The Burning Mirror, was shortlisted for the Saltire Society First Book Prize in 2001.

Saadi has written stage and radio plays including The Dark Island, The White Cliffs and Saame Sita. He has edited or co-edited a number of anthologies including Shorts: The Macallan Scotland on Sunday Short Story Collection; A Fictional Guide to Scotland; and Freedom Spring: Ten Years On, a compilation of new writing from South Africa and Scotland.  He has appeared widely on television, radio and in public literary readings and is currently working on another novel.

Suhayl Saadi has also written song lyrics for classical and folk-rock musical ensembles, including the Edinburgh-based Dunedin Consort, and for the Africa-centred World AIDS Day Project Paradisum. His work has appeared in translation in anthologies, as in 2006 in German in Cool Britannia (Al Kennedy, ed. Berlin: Verlag Klaus Wagenbach).

Among more recent works, Saadi wrote the libretto for Queens of Govan, one of five short operas commissioned in 2007 by the Scottish Opera for its 2008 "Five:15" project.

Saadi is a board member and co-director of the arts production company Heer Productions Limited, which established the Pakistani Film, Media and Arts Festival in the United Kingdom in 2005.

During the month of October 2008, Saadi was the British Council Writer-in-Residence at George Washington University in Washington, D.C.

A novel, Joseph's Box, inspired by the Biblical/Quranic account of Joseph and Potiphar's wife, was published by Two Ravens Press in August 2009 and was nominated for the IMPAC Dublin Literary Award 2011. The novel is set in Scotland, England, Sicily and Pakistan.

Bibliography
Books
2009: Joseph's Box. Ullapool: Two Ravens Press. Paperback: .
 2004:  Psychoraag.  Edinburgh:  Black & White Publishing.  Hardcover: . Paperback:  .
 2004:  The White Cliffs.  Dingwall: Sandstone Press.  .
 2001:  The Burning Mirror.  Edinburgh:  Polygon Books. Paperback: , .
 1997:  The Snake.  (Under the pen name Melanie Desmoulins.) Creation Books. Paperback: .

Plays
 2006:  Garden of the Fourteenth Moon.
 2005:   The White Cliffs.  Glasgow.
 2004:  The Dark Island.  London, BBC Radio 4.
 2003:  Saame Sita.  Edinburgh.

Librettos
 2007:  Queens of Govan, libretto, Scottish Opera Five:15 project.

Anthologies
 2005:  Freedom Spring: Ten Years On.  Editors: Suhayl Saadi, Catherine McInerney.  New Lanark: Waverley Books.  Paperback: , .
 2003:  A Fictional Guide to Scotland.  Editors: Meaghan Delahunt, Suhayl Saadi, Elizabeth Reeder.  Glasgow: OpenInk.  Paperback: , .
 2003:  Shorts: The Macallan Scotland on Sunday Short Story Collection.  Editor: Suhayl Saadi.  Edinburgh: Polygon Books.   Paperback:  ,  .

Saadi was also a contributor to Pax Edina: The One O' Clock Gun Anthology (Edinburgh, 2010)

Novellas
 2006:  The Saelig Tales.  In Magic Afoot, the first print edition of Textualities magazine.  , .
 2005:  The Aerodrome.  Dingwall:  Sandstone Press. Published online .
 2006: The White Cliffs. Dingwall: Sandstone Press. Paperback , .
 2008:  The Spanish House.  Published online by the University of Glasgow Association for Scottish Literary Studies in its biannual ezine The Bottle Imp.

References

External links
→ Note on web searches: Saadi will occasionally be found misspelled as Saadhi.
 Suhayl Saadi website
 Joseph's Box website
 Suhayl Saadi on Laura Hird's website.
 Scots Today by John Corbett for BBC Voices.
 Suhayl Saadi on the Devolving Diasporas project sponsored by the Arts and Humanities Research Council, Newcastle University, and the University of Stirling.
  5 October 2006.
Reviews and interviews relating to the novel, Joseph's Box can be located at the following sites:
3am magazine
kitaabonline magazine
The Independent newspaper
The List magazine
Edinburgh Festivals
Scotland on Sunday
The Herald newspaper
The Independent newspaper
Vulpes Libris magazine
The Glasgow Review
 Cargo Publishing podcast interview
 Feature documentary about Saadi

1961 births
Living people
Scottish writers
People associated with Glasgow
Scottish people of Pakistani descent
People from Beverley
Scottish dramatists and playwrights
Scottish opera librettists
British writers of Pakistani descent
PEN Oakland/Josephine Miles Literary Award winners